Hubert Jean Daniel Lefèbvre (28 November 1878 in Paris – 26 September 1937 in Labaroche) was a French rugby union player who competed in the 1900 Summer Olympics. He was a member of the French rugby union team, which won the gold medal. Lefèbvre played forward.

Lefèbvre played club rugby with Racing Club de France from 1895 to 1902 and was a member of the 1900 and 1902 French championship teams. In the 1902 final, a 6–0 victory, he scored the final try just before the half.

Lefèbvre was educated at the Lycée Charlemagne and Centrale Graduate School in engineering. He served in World War I, rising to the rank of captain.

References

External links

profile
ESPN profile

1878 births
1937 deaths
Rugby union players from Paris
French rugby union players
Rugby union players at the 1900 Summer Olympics
Olympic rugby union players of France
Olympic gold medalists for France
Medalists at the 1900 Summer Olympics
French military personnel of World War I